Carstairs railway station serves the village of Carstairs in South Lanarkshire, Scotland and is a major junction station on the West Coast Main Line (WCML), situated close to the point at which the lines from London Euston and Edinburgh to Glasgow Central merge. Constructed originally by the Caledonian Railway, the station is operated today by ScotRail and is also served by one TransPennine Express trains service per day between Manchester Airport and Glasgow Central. All other services by TransPennine Express and services operated by Avanti West Coast, Caledonian Sleeper, CrossCountry and London North Eastern Railway pass the station, but do not stop.

History
Construction work started on the site on 30 August 1845 and the station was opened by the Caledonian Railway on 15 February 1848 when the line between Glasgow and Beattock opened. The line from Edinburgh reached Carstairs and opened on 1 April 1848. By 1855 traffic had increased substantially, and the Caledonian Railway spent around £15,000 at Carstairs increasing capacity to allow incoming trains from Glasgow, Edinburgh and the north to be arranged for their journey south.

In 1885 a correspondent known as Trans-Clyde to the Glasgow Herald reported on the poor state of the platforms at Carstairs:In the interest of the travelling public whose number is legion, allow me to bring to notice the most urgent and pressing necessity which exists for the directors of the Caledonian Railway taking immediate measures to put the platform at Carstairs Junction into such a condition as shall answer efficiently all the purposes of a railway platform intended for the use of travellers…If your or any of your readers have been to Carstairs Railway Station, on the opening of the doors of the railway carriage they must have seen that the stone platform on which they are required to alight for the purpose of changing carriages (the main or almost sole object of this station) is several feet below the level of the carriage which they occupy-how many feet in each case I cannot say, as it may vary but lately I took occasion to measure the distance between the platform and the floor of a carriage from which I had managed to descend, and found it to be 3 feet 4 inches at least. 

From 1888 to 1895 the station was also the terminus of the Carstairs House Tramway which connected to Carstairs House.

Between 1914 and 1916 the Caledonian Railway began an extensive reconstruction of the station. The existing island platform buildings were remodelled with new windows and doors and the exterior was given a dressed stonework finish. The accommodation comprised ladies’ and gentlemen's waiting rooms, a telegraph office, a tea room and offices for the station staff. The constricted layout of only one set of up and down through lines was expanded with the provision of loop lines for both up and down trains to allow non-stop trains to bypass any trains stopped at the station. The improvements were prepared under the direction of W.A. Paterson, the engineer-in-chief of the company. The contract for the reconstruction was won by John Shirlaw of Carluke. The reconstruction cost £22,391.

The London, Midland and Scottish Railway constructed an experimental locomotive. LMS 6399 Fury. On a test run from Glasgow to Carstairs scheduled for 10 February 1930 it was approaching Carstairs station at slow speed, when one of the ultra-high-pressure tubes burst and the escaping steam ejected the coal fire through the fire-hole door, killing Lewis Schofield of the Superheater Company.

Electrification 
As part of this the station was re-signalled. The critical point was the connection from Edinburgh on a minimum radius curve to provide a connection into the Down platform whilst avoiding the installation of a diamond crossing. The provision of superelevation through the Up platform for 90 mph running required deep ballasting; this required the platform to be raised. The original station buildings were being retained, and continuous railings were provided to prevent passengers accidentally falling down from one level to the other. This height difference has now been removed as the original station buildings were demolished and replaced with a more modern alternative and the entire platform was levelled off. The only remnant of the original station buildings was the integral footbridge, now adapted as a stand-alone structure.

The route to Edinburgh was not part of the 1970s scheme; however, it was included as part of the late 1980s ECML scheme, with electric services starting to use the line in 1989 (before the main East Coast Main Line (ECML) electric services started).

Carstairs Improvement Works 
On 4 March 2023, Network Rail closed the station until 30 May 2023 as part of a major upgrade to the junction south of the station. This has resulted in the temporary closure of the station to allow upgrade works to the station and junction to take place. This will see line speeds through Carstairs increased significantly, a freight loop capable of holding trains of up to 775 meters, as well as allow possibilities for the station to become more accessible in the future, as no step free access from platform to street is currently available.

Stationmasters 

William Irvine c. 1851 ca. 1852
John Samuel 1865 - 1871 (afterwards station master at Stirling)
William Dickson 1875 - 1883
Robert Murray 1884 - 1900 (formerly station master at Coatbridge)
Thomas Allison 1900 -  1902 (afterwards station master at Glasgow Central)
Montague Blackett Yule 1902 - 1914
George Airth 1914 - 1928
Andrew S. Twaddell 1928 - 1937
Thomas Coyle 1937 - 1947
John Johnstone 1950 - 1953 (formerly station master at Gorgie, afterwards station master at Galashiels)

Locale 
Just south of the station, there is an important triangular junction (Carstairs Junction) where the West Coast Main Line (WCML) divides.  The north-westerly route goes via Motherwell to Glasgow and the north-easterly route goes towards Edinburgh, where the East Coast Main Line begins. The southbound route goes towards  and London Euston. The line between Edinburgh and Glasgow is the only part of the West Coast Main Line used by London North Eastern Railway services. Carstairs is also a marshalling point and the final boarding point (both sleeping car and overnight coach) in Scotland for the Lowland Caledonian Sleeper trains from Glasgow and Edinburgh to London Euston.

Northbound (Down) WCML services usually pass the station on an avoiding line (known as the Down Main), away from the platform line (known as the Down platform), but northbound services coming off the chord from Edinburgh (LNER and CrossCountry) usually pass Platform 1: they cannot be signalled from Platform 2,  . However, all southbound (Up) services   pass through Platform 2 (on the Up Main),  they can also be diverted through the down platform(1). The Up Main and Down Platform lines are both signalled for bi-directional working, and are often used as passing loops for passenger and freight services. For example, the early morning departure for Glasgow Central from North Berwick will wait at the Down Platform as a fast TransPennine Express service from Manchester passes.

There is also the Down Passenger Loop (which is adjacent to the station) and the Up Passenger Loop (immediately to the north of the station) which are both used to stop freight services while faster passenger services pass. It is also common for northbound freights to be stopped in both the Down Platform line and Down Passenger Loop and for fast passenger services to be passed between them on the Down Main.

Services

Historical 
Carstairs was an important junction station where northbound West Coast Main Line trains were split into separate portions for Glasgow, Edinburgh and (to a lesser extent) Stirling and Perth, and for the corresponding combining of southbound trains. However, the introduction of push-pull operation on the WCML and the availability of surplus HST sets for Cross Country traffic (as a result of the ECML electrification) largely eliminated this practice in the early 1990s. Apart from the sleeping car trains, express traffic through Carstairs now consists of fixed-formation trains which do not require to be remarshalled en route. As a result, few express trains now call at Carstairs. There were some local stopping services to Edinburgh and Glasgow, but they were relatively infrequent. Before December 2012, only two trains per day to North Berwick called, and only five trains to Glasgow (three trains went to Dalmuir and two to Central and one terminated at Motherwell). There were very large gaps in between trains with the two Edinburgh-bound trains calling at 07:49 and then again at 15:40; similarly, for the Glasgow trains there was a gap from 07:55 to 18:41.

2019 
Prior to March 2020 on Monday to Saturdays, there was a roughly two-hourly service to both Glasgow Central and Edinburgh Waverley (with a few longer gaps) for most of the day, with a few services extended to Ayr and North Berwick; the last northbound service from Edinburgh terminates at Motherwell. There were also a few extra trains operated by ScotRail to/from Glasgow Central Low Level which call at peak times. These operate to Motherwell, Garscadden and Dalmuir. These services do not run on Saturdays, so a slightly reduced service operates from the station on Saturday mornings, In addition, TransPennine Express also provide one train per day to Glasgow Central and one train per day to Liverpool Lime Street via Preston.

2021 
As a result of the COVID-19 pandemic, the station has had its services significantly reduced, with large gaps in between trains during the day.

On weekdays, there are eight trains per day from the station, with five running to Glasgow Central departing at 05:49, 07:39, 07:44, 08:10 and 18:21, and two trains running to Edinburgh Waverley departing at 07:49 and 20:32. The last northbound service at 23:59 terminates at Motherwell. All trains are operated by ScotRail with the exception of the 07:44 to Glasgow Central, which is operated by TransPennine Express.

On Saturday, the service is the same as the weekday timetable, excluding the 07:39 service to Glasgow Central which does not operate. On Sunday, there is a single train running to Manchester Airport, which is operated by TransPennine Express. There is no northbound service on Sunday.

References

Notes

Sources 

 
 
 

Railway stations in South Lanarkshire
Former Caledonian Railway stations
Railway stations in Great Britain opened in 1848
Railway stations served by ScotRail
Railway stations served by Caledonian Sleeper
Railway stations served by TransPennine Express
SPT railway stations
Rail junctions in Scotland
Stations on the West Coast Main Line